are crunchy bits of deep fried flour-batter used in Japanese cuisine, specifically in dishes such as soba, udon, takoyaki and okonomiyaki. Hot plain soba and udon with added tenkasu are called tanuki-soba and tanuki-udon (haikara-soba and haikara-udon in Kansai region).

They are also called . According to the NHK Broadcasting Culture Research Institute, 68% Japanese called it tenkasu and 29% called it agedama in 2003. Tenkasu is more common in western Japan and agedama is more common in eastern Japan.

See also
Scraps (batter)
Youtiao
Cak-Cak
Fried dough
Fried dough foods

References

Japanese cuisine terms
Soba
Udon
Deep fried foods